Melanophryniscus klappenbachi (common name: Klappenbach's red-bellied frog) is a species of toad in the family Bufonidae. It is found in the Gran Chaco in northern Argentina, Paraguay, and Brazil (Mato Grosso do Sul), and possibly in Bolivia. Its specific name refers to Miguel Angel Klappenbach, a Uruguayan zoologist.

Its natural habitats are shrublands, and it can also be found in disturbed areas such as livestock farms. It is an explosive breeder utilizing temporary pools.

Alkaloids produce toxins when consumed in large amounts, and one of the toxins that is given off is  batrachotoxin-homobatrachotoxin, which contributes to the toxicity of the species. When fed diets with low levels of alkaloids, there was a decrease in the amount of this toxin produced.

Melanophryniscus klappenbachi is a common species facing no significant threats. It is present in the international pet trade.

References

klappenbachi
Amphibians of Argentina
Amphibians of Brazil
Amphibians of Paraguay
Amphibians described in 2000
Taxonomy articles created by Polbot